The governor of the Commonwealth of Kentucky is the head of government of Kentucky, and serves as commander-in-chief of the state's military forces. The governor has a duty to enforce state laws; the power to either approve or veto bills passed by the Kentucky General Assembly; the power to convene the legislature; and the power to grant pardons, except in cases of treason and impeachment. The governor is also empowered to reorganize the state government or reduce it in size. Historically, the office has been regarded as one of the most powerful executive positions in the United States.

Fifty-nine individuals have held the office of governor. Prior to a 1992 amendment to the state's constitution, the governor was prohibited from succeeding himself or herself in office, though four men (Isaac Shelby, John L. Helm, James B. McCreary and Happy Chandler) served multiple non-consecutive terms. Paul E. Patton, the first Kentucky governor eligible for a second consecutive term under the amendment, won his reelection bid in 1999. James Garrard succeeded himself in 1800, before the constitutional provision existed. Garrard is also the longest serving governor, serving for a total period of eight years and 90 days.

William Goebel, who was elected to the office in the disputed election of 1899, remains the only governor of any U.S. state to die from assassination while in office. Goebel is also the shortest serving governor, serving for a period of only three days. Martha Layne Collins, who held the office from 1983 to 1987, was the first woman to serve as governor and was only the third woman to serve as governor of any U.S. state who was not the wife or widow of a previous governor. The 63rd and current Kentucky governor is Democrat Andy Beshear, who took office on December 10, 2019.

Governors
Kentucky County, Virginia was admitted to the Union as Kentucky on June 1, 1792. There have been 59 governors, serving 63 distinct terms.

An unelected group proclaimed Kentucky's secession from the Union on November 20, 1861, and it was annexed by the Confederate States of America on December 10, 1861. The Confederate government elected two governors, but it never held much control over the state.

The original 1792 Kentucky Constitution had the governor chosen by an electoral college for a term of four years, commencing on the first day of June. The second constitution in 1799 changed this to a popular vote, prevented governors from succeeding themselves within seven years of their terms, and moved the start date to the fourth Tuesday after the election. The third constitution in 1850 reduced the succession limitation to four years, and moved the start date of the term to the fifth Tuesday after the election. A 1992 amendment allowed governors to have a second term before being prevented from succeeding themselves for four years. Originally, should the office of governor be vacant, the speaker of the Senate would exercise the powers of the office; in 1799, the office of lieutenant governor was created to fill this role, and, as of 1992, is elected on the same ticket as the governor.

Confederate governors

During the Civil War, a group of secessionists met at Russellville to form a Confederate government for the Commonwealth of Kentucky. This government never successfully displaced the government in Frankfort, and Kentucky remained in the Union through the entire war. Two men were elected governor of the Confederate government: George W. Johnson, who served from November 20, 1861, to his death on April 8, 1862, at the Battle of Shiloh, and, on Johnson's death, Richard Hawes, who served until the Confederate surrender on April 9, 1865. The Confederate government disbanded shortly after the end of the war in 1865.

See also
 Timeline of Kentucky history

Notes

References

General

 
 
 

Constitution

 
 
 
 

Specific

External links

Office of the Governor of Kentucky

Lists of state governors of the United States
 
Governors